Phillip Goodhand-Tait (born 3 January 1945, Hull, East Riding of Yorkshire, England) is an English singer-songwriter, record producer and keyboard player.

Life and career
Goodhand-Tait was known as Phil Tait in his school years. His mother was a piano teacher and his father was involved in trade unions. Goodhand-Tait began his music career shortly after the family moved to Guildford, Surrey, in 1957. His first group, Phill Tone and the Vibrants, was renamed Phill and the Stormsville Shakers in 1961. The band included Paul Demers on drums, Ivor Shackleton on guitar, and Kirk Riddle on bass. By 1966, the same year the group released its first singles, the Stormsville Shakers's lineup included Tait, Riddle, Ian Jelfs on guitar, David Sherrington on tenor sax, and Alan Bunn on drums. That same year Mel Collins was recruited on second tenor sax. In 1967, the band's name changed to Circus, releasing further singles sides. January 1969 saw Goodhand-Tait exit the group to pursue a solo career, leaving Jelfs, Collins, Riddle, and new drummer Chris Burrows to write, record and release the self-titled pop-jazz album Circus, after which they disbanded in 1970.

Goodhand-Tait wrote and recorded songs that have been covered by Roger Daltrey ("Oceans Away",  "Parade", and "Leon"), Euson ("Leon"), Gene Pitney ("You Are" and "Oceans Away"), Zoot Money ("No One But You"), and Love Affair ("Bringing on Back the Good Times", "A Day Without Love", "Lincoln County", "One Road" and "Baby I Know").

In 1971 Goodhand-Tait wrote the soundtrack for the film Universal Soldier. In 1976 he played the harmonium on Chris De Burgh's album, Spanish Train and Other Stories.

Goodhand-Tait has also produced live albums by Magnum, Venom, Climax Blues Band, Kid Creole and the Coconuts and The Lords of the New Church.

In 2021, Goodhand-Tait's DJM output was released on CD for the first time in the UK after being out of print for many years. The box set, titled Gone Are The Songs of Yesterday and released by Cherry Red Records, includes Rehearsal, I Think I'll Write a Song, Songfall, and Phillip Goodhand-Tait as well as bonus material including singles, B-sides, and previously unreleased songs featured in Universal Soldier. The albums concurrently made their debut on streaming platforms such as Spotify.

Solo discography

Studio albums
Rehearsal – 1971 – DJM
I Think I'll Write a Song – 1971 – DJM
Songfall – 1972 – DJM
Phillip Goodhand-Tait – 1973 – DJM
Oceans Away – 1976 – Chrysalis
Teaching an Old Dog New Tricks – 1977 – Chrysalis
Good Old Phil's – 1980 – Gundog
An Evening With Peggy Sue – 2006 – Span TV
The Last Laugh – 2008 – Span TV

Compilation albums
Jingle-Jangle Man – 1975 – DJM

Live albums
Radio Songs: 1977 Recordings from Radio Bremen – 2010 – Span TV (original) Angel Air (2011 re-release)
Age of Bewilderment Vol. 1 – with David Sherrington (live album) – 2012 – Span TV
Age of Bewilderment Vol. 2 – with David Sherrington (live album) – 2012 – Span TV

Original UK singles
"Love Has Got Hold of Me" / "Too Pleased to Help" (Decca F12868 – 1969)
"Jeannie" / "Run See The Sun" (DJM Records DJS 10230 – 1970)
"Everyday" / "I Think I'll Write A Song" (DJM Records DJS 10261 – 1971)
"Oh Rosanna" / "I Didn't Know Myself" (DJM Records DJS 10236 – 1971)
"City Streets" / "Moon" (DJM Records) DJS 10268 – 1972)
"You Are" / "Five Flight Walk Up" (DJM Records DJS 102978 – 1974)
"Almost Killed A Man" / "Reach Out For Each Other" (DJM Records DJS 295 – 1974)
"I Think I Can Believe" / "One More Rodeo" (DJM Records DJS 319 – 1974)
"Sweet Emotion" / "Jesus Didn't Only Love The Cowboys" (DJM Records DJS 10601 – 1974)
"Oceans Away" / "Can You Demonstrate" (Chrysalis Records CHS 2100 – 1976)
"Jewel" / "Old Fashioned Love" (Chrysalis Records CHS2134 – 1977)
"Don't Treat Your Lover Like A Thief" / "If We Ever Meet Again" (Chrysalis Records CHS 2169 – 1977)
"Angeltown" / "If We Ever Meet Again" (Chrysalis Records CHS 2183 – 1977)
"Fly Me To The Sun" / "Sunshine On Ice" (Gundog Records GUNS 2 – 1980)
"Wolfgang" (Span TV Records SPTVS1 – 2018)

International exclusive singles
"Medicine Man" / "Sunrise Sunset" (DJM Records/Hansa 10967 – 1971) [Germany]
"Sugar Train" / "Forever Kind of Love" (20th Century Records TC-2059 – 1973) [United States]
"Leon" / "Everyday" (DJM Records 6102 320 – 1974) [Netherlands]
"Warm Summer Rain" / "One More Rodeo" (DJM Records 6102 325 – 1974) [Netherlands]
"Sugar Train" / "Reach Out For Each Other" (DJM Records 6102 331 – 1974) [Netherlands}
"Heartbeat" / "Radio Play That Song Again" (Instant Records IS1501 – 1983) [Germany]
"He'll Have to Go" / "Fly Me To The Sun" (Instant Records IS1506 – 1983) [Germany]

References

External links
Goodhand-Tait official website
Stormsville Shakers official website

1945 births
Living people
English male singer-songwriters
English record producers
English session musicians
Musicians from Kingston upon Hull
Chrysalis Records artists